Anametalia regularis is a species of sea urchin of the family Brissidae. Their armour is covered with spines. It is placed in the genus Anametalia and lives in the sea. Anametalia regularis was first scientifically described in 1925 by Hubert Clark.

References 

Brissidae
Animals described in 1925
Taxa named by Hubert Lyman Clark